Qahej-e Bala (also Romanized as Qahej-e Bālā) is a village in Kharqan Rural District, Bastam District, Shahrud County, Semnan Province, Iran. At the 2006 census, its population was 204, in 57 families.

References 

Populated places in Shahrud County